The 1983–84 Northern Football League season was the 86th in the history of Northern Football League, a football competition in England.

Division One

Division One featured 16 clubs which competed in the division last season, along with two new clubs, promoted from Division Two:
 Gretna
 Peterlee Newtown

League table

Division Two

Division Two featured nine clubs which competed in the division last season, along with nine new clubs.
 Clubs relegated from Division One:
 Durham City
 West Auckland Town
 Willington
 Clubs joined from the Wearside Football League:
 Brandon United
 Chester-le-Street Town
 Seaham Colliery Welware
 Clubs joined from the Northern Football Alliance:
 Darlington Cleveland Bridge
 Shotton Comrades
 Plus:
 Langley Park

League table

References

External links
 Northern Football League official site

Northern Football League seasons
1983–84 in English football leagues